El Fraile (Spanish: The Friar) refers to:
 El Fraile (Sierra del Cabo de Gata), the highest peak in the Sierra del Cabo de Gata, Spain
 Fort Drum (El Fraile Island), a fortified island in the Philippines
 Nevado El Fraile, a high volcanic peak in the Andes, Chile

See also
 Fraile (disambiguation)